Tachinoestrus is a genus of flies in the family Tachinidae.

Species
Tachinoestrus semenovi Portschinsky, 1887

References

Tachinidae
Diptera of Asia
Taxa named by Josef Aloizievitsch Portschinsky